Richard Javier Pellejero Ferreira (born 30 May 1976) is a Uruguayan retired footballer who played as a central midfielder and current head coach of Miramar Misiones.

Pellejero had a spell in the Primera B Nacional Argentina with Quilmes during 2008.

Career

Coaching career
After retiring at the end of 2019, Pellejero started his coaching career. On 3 August 2020, Pellejero was officially presented as Miramar Misiones' new head coach, which was his first experience outside the pitch.

References

1976 births
Living people
Uruguayan footballers
Uruguayan expatriate footballers
Footballers from Montevideo
Uruguayan Primera División players
Chilean Primera División players
C.A. Cerro players
Club Nacional de Football players
Centro Atlético Fénix players
Danubio F.C. players
Quilmes Atlético Club footballers
Universidad de Concepción footballers
Sud América players
Uruguayan expatriate sportspeople in Argentina
Uruguayan expatriate sportspeople in Chile
Uruguayan expatriate sportspeople in Ecuador
Expatriate footballers in Argentina
Expatriate footballers in Chile
Expatriate footballers in Ecuador
Uruguayan football managers

Association football midfielders